Uitkamp Wetland Nature Reserve is a  wetland reserve located in Durbanville in the Western Cape province of South Africa .

A wetland valley that was proclaimed a nature reserve in 2001, this park lies within a region of Swartland Shale Renosterveld. It protects over 140 species of plants, many of which are very rare. More common Pink Watsonias and Arum Lilies cover the wetland in the spring, along with Restios, orchids, sundews and other colourful flowers. 

A major threat to the wetlands is from the invasive alien plants Port Jackson (Acacia saligna) and Kikuyu grass (Pennisetum clandestinum).

See also
 Biodiversity of Cape Town
 List of nature reserves in Cape Town
 Swartland Shale Renosterveld
 Cape Lowland Freshwater Wetland

References

 
Nature reserves in Cape Town
Protected areas of the Western Cape
Wetlands of South Africa